was a Japanese daimyō of the Edo period.  He was the head of the Okayama Domain. His childhood name was Taro (太郎). His mother was the granddaughter of second Shōgun Tokugawa Hidetada.

His adopted daughter married the court noble Ichijō Kaneka.

Family
 Father: Ikeda Mitsumasa
 Mother: Katsuhime (1618-1678)
 Wife: Niwa Senko
 Concubines:
 Kikuno
 Eiko-in
 Children
 Ikeda Yoshimasa (1678-1695)
 Ikeda Noritaka (1680-1720) by Kikuno
 Ikeda Masayuki (1696-1709)
 Ikeda Tsugumasa by Eiko-in
 Ikeda Masazumi (1706-1766) by Eiko-in
 Ikeda Tsuneyuki (1672-1679)
 Matsuhime married Hotta Masanaka
 Furihime married Honda Tadakuni
 Kikuhime Yamauchi Toyohusa
 Masako married Mori Yoshimoto
 Haruko married Tachibana Akitaka
 Tsumahime betrothed to Kanamori Yoritoki

See also
Kōraku-en

References

1638 births
1714 deaths
Daimyo
Ikeda clan